The Cagliari light rail system, commercially known as Metrocagliari, is a two-line light rail system that serves the town of Cagliari and part of its metropolitan area, in Sardinia, Italy. The system was inaugurated in 2008 and has subsequently been expanded to two lines.

History
The Cagliari light rail system was created through a rebuilding, electrification, and modernization of an urban-suburban section of a previously existing  gauge railway line operating out of Cagliari, owned by Ferrovie della Sardegna. The first stage involved rebuilding, as a light rail line, the  section between that line's Cagliari terminal station, at Piazza Repubblica, and Monserrato.  The work included adding stations, installing overhead lines, and adding passing tracks in some locations along the single-track line.  Once the construction was completed and the vehicles ready for use, a much greater frequency of service than existed previously on the line would be introduced, using the new trams and stops.

Construction began in June 2004 and was substantially completed in May 2007.  A fleet of six Škoda 06 T trams was purchased, and they were delivered in 2007.

The route had nine stations at that stage. An extension from Monserrato to Policlinico was already under construction at that time, but that project was not yet fully funded.

On 14 February 2015, line 1 was extended from San Gottardo to Policlinico (University Hospital), adding two stations and increasing the total number of stations to eleven.

The next extension opened less than two months later, and was another upgrading and electrification of an existing section of diesel railway line, from San Gottardo to Settimo San Pietro.  Light rail service on that section began operation on 3 April 2015 and is designated as line 2.

Planned extension of the line into central Cagliari, from Piazza Repubblica to Piazza Matteotti and the Cagliari railway station of Rete Ferroviaria Italiana, is in the final design stages and it is projected that the work may begin in 2017.   This extension is very significant, because it will connect the tramway with the transportation hub of the city, home to the train and suburban buses station, and hub for local bus services.

Fleet

The initial fleet consisted of six Škoda 06 T trams, delivered in 2007. A contract for the purchase of three additional trams was awarded in 2013 to Construcciones y Auxiliar de Ferrocarriles (CAF), for a five-section, 32.9-metre-long Urbos 2 model. The CAF cars were delivered in November 2016, but delays were encountered in obtaining authorisation to place them in service. The three CAF Urbos trams finally entered service on 21 April 2018.

Former tram system
Cagliari had a tram system from 1893 to 1973. At its maximum extent it had six lines.

Gallery

See also
Trolleybuses in Cagliari

References

Further reading

External links

Metrocagliari webpage of ARST

Cagliari
Railway lines in Sardinia
Light rail in Italy
950 mm gauge railways in Italy
Railway lines opened in 2008